Condica is a genus of moths of the family Noctuidae. The genus was erected by Francis Walker in 1856.

Species
 Condica abstemia (Guenée, 1852)
 Condica agnata (Felder, 1874)
 Condica albigera Guenée, 1852
 Condica albigutta (Wileman, 1912)
 Condica albolabes (Grote, 1880)
 Condica albomaculata (Moore, 1867)
 Condica albopicta (Graeser, 1892)
 Condica andrena (Smith, 1911)
 Condica aroana (Bethune-Baker, 1906)
 Condica atricuprea (Hampson, 1908)
 Condica atricupreoides (Draeseke, 1928)
 Condica begallo (Barnes, 1905)
 Condica capensis (Guenée, 1852)
 Condica charada (Schaus, 1906)
 Condica cinifacta (Draudt, 1950)
 Condica circuita (Guenée, 1852)
 Condica claufacta (Walker, 1857)
 Condica concisa Walker, 1856
 Condica conducta (Walker, [1857])
 Condica confederata (Grote, 1873)
 Condica cupentia (Cramer, [1779])
 Condica cyclica Hampson, 1908
 Condica cyclioides (Draudt, 1950)
 Condica discistriga Smith, 1894
 Condica dolorosa (Walker, 1865)
 Condica egestis (Smith, 1894)
 Condica enigmatica (Turati & Krüger, 1936)
 Condica fuliginosa Leech, 1900
 Condica griseata (Leech, 1900)
 Condica hippia (H. Druce, 1889)
 Condica hypocritica Dyar, 1907
 Condica illecta (Walker, 1865)
 Condica illustrata Staudinger, 1888
 Condica leucorena (Smith, 1900)
 Condica lineata (H. Druce, 1889)
 Condica luxuriosa (Dyar, 1926)
 Condica mersa Morrison, 1875
 Condica mobilis (Walker, [1857])
 Condica morsa (Smith, 1907)
 Condica orta Barnes & McDunnough, 1912
 Condica palaestinensis Staudinger, 1894
 Condica pallescens Sugi, 1970
 Condica paraspicea de Joannis, 1928
 Condica parista (Schaus, 1921)
 Condica parva (Leech, 1900)
 Condica pauperata (Walker, 1858)
 Condica praesecta (Warren, 1912)
 Condica punctifera (Walker, [1857])
 Condica pyromphalus (Dyar, 1913)
 Condica roxana H. Druce, 1898
 Condica roxanoides Angulo & Olivares, 1999
 Condica scherdlini (Oberthür, 1921)
 Condica serva (Walker, 1858)
 Condica subaurea (Guenée, 1852)
 Condica sublucens (Warren, 1912)
 Condica subornata (Walker, 1865)
 Condica sutor (Guenée, 1852)
 Condica temecula (Barnes, 1905)
 Condica tibetica Draudt, 1950
 Condica vacillans (Walker, 1858)
 Condica vecors Guenée, 1852
 Condica videns Guenée, 1852
 Condica violascens Hampson, 1914
 Condica viscosa (Freyer, 1831)

References
 
 

Condicinae